Michel Surya (born 1954) is a French writer, philosopher and publisher.

Publications

Tales 
1988: Exit, preface by Bernard Noël, Séguier, reprint followed by Les Noyés Éditions Farrago/, 2001.
1990: Les Noyés, Séguier; reprint Éditions Farrago/Éditions Léo Scheer preceded by Exit, 2001.
1995: Défiguration, Fourbis
1996: Olivet, Fourbis
2006: L'Éternel Retour : roman, Éditions Lignes
2010: L'Impasse, 
2016: Le Mort-Né, Al Dante

Essais 
1987: Georges Bataille : la mort à l’œuvre, éditions Séguier; nouvelle éd. augmentée et mise à jour, Éditions Gallimard, 1992; reprint Gallimard, series « Tel », 2012
1999: De la domination : le capital, la transparence et les affaires, Farrago
1999: L’Imprécation littéraire : Antelme, Artaud, Bataille, Chestov, Debord, Klossowski, Rushdie, Sade, in Matériologies, I, Farrago
1999: De l’argent : la ruine de la politique, in De la domination II, Éditions Payot.
2000: Portrait de l’intellectuel en animal de compagnie, De la domination, III, Farrago
2000: Mots et mondes de Pierre Guyotat, in Matériologies, II, Farrago, 2000.
2001: Humanimalité, éditions du Néant
2004: La Révolution rêvée, Fayard
2004: Humanimalités, précédé de L'idiotie de Bataille, in Matériologies, III, Léo Scheer
2007: Portrait de l'intermittent du spectacle en supplétif de la domination, in De la domination, IV, Éditions Lignes
2010: Excepté le possible : Jacques Dupin, Roger Laporte, Bernard Noël, Fissile & co
2011: Le Polième (Bernard Noël) , in Matériologies, IV, Nouvelles éditions Lignes
2012: Sainteté de Bataille, 
2013: Les Singes de leur idéal. Sur l'usage récent du mot "changement", De la domination, V, Nouvelles éditions Lignes
2015: L'Autre Blanchot. L'écriture de jour, l'écriture de nuit, Gallimard
2016: Capitalisme et djihadisme. Une guerre de religion, Nouvelles éditions Lignes

Editions and prefaces 
 Emily Brontë, Les Hauts de Hurlevent, illustré de 15 dessins à la plume de Balthus, Paris, Séguier, 1990.
 Véronique Bergen, Jean Genet, entre mythe et réalité, De Boeck université, 1993.
 D.A.F. de Sade, Français encore un effort si vous voulez être républicains, Paris, Fourbis, 1996
 Georges Bataille, Choix de lettres (1917-1962), Paris, Gallimard, coll. « Les Cahiers de la NRF », 1997.
 Georges Bataille, Une Liberté souveraine. Textes et entretiens, Paris, Farrago, 2000 (édité partiellement dans le catalogue de l’exposition du centième anniversaire de la naissance de Georges Bataille à la médiathèque d'Orléans, Paris, Fourbis, 1997)
 Bernard Noël, Les Premiers mots, Paris, Flammarion/Léo Scheer, 2003
 Paule Thévenin, Antonin Artaud : fin de l’ère chrétienne, Paris, Lignes/Léo Scheer, 2006
 Christine Lavant, Das Kind, Paris, Lignes/Léo Scheer, 2006.
 Georges Bataille, Charlotte d’Ingerville, suivi de Sainte, Paris, Lignes/Léo Scheer, 2006. 
 Georges Bataille, La Structure psychologique du fascisme, Paris, Nouvelles Éditions Lignes, 2009.
 Alain Hobé, Lieu commun, Fissile, 2009
 Alain Jugnon, L’Écriture matérielle, Paris, Le Limon, 2010.
 Georges Bataille, Discussion sur le péché, Paris, Nouvelles Éditions Lignes, 2010.
 Georges Bataille, La Notion de dépense, présentation de Francis Marmande, Paris, Nouvelles Éditions Lignes, 2011.
 Georges Bataille, L'Anus solaire suivi de Sacrifices, Paris, Nouvelles Éditions Lignes, 2011.
 Georges Bataille, La Souveraineté, Paris, Nouvelles Éditions Lignes, 2012.
 Georges Bataille, L'Alleluiah. Catéchisme de Dianus, Paris, Nouvelles Éditions Lignes, 2012.
 Georges Bataille et André Breton, « Contre-Attaque ». Union de lutte des intellectuels révolutionnaires : « Les Cahiers » et les autres documents, octobre 1935-mai 1936, Paris, Ypsilon Éditeur, coll. « Contre-attaque », 2013.
 Jean-Noël Vuarnet, El filosofo-artista, Editions incorpore, 2015. (Spain)
 Amandine André, De la destruction, Al Dante, 2016.
 Georges Bataille, A Experiência interior, Autêntica, 2017. (Brazil)
 Dionys Mascolo, Le Communisme, Paris, Lignes, 2018.
 Georges Bataille, Das Blau des Himmels, Matthes & Seitz, 2018. (Germany)
 Alain Jugnon, L’Ivre Nietzsche, Toulon, La Nerthe, 2019.
 Sylvain Santi, Cerner le réel. Christian Prigent à l’œuvre, Presses universitaires de Lyon, 2019.
 Georges Bataille, Der Fluch des Ökonomie, Matthes & Seitz, 2019. (Germany)
 Georges Bataille, Die Erotik'', Matthes & Seitz, 2020. (Germany)

References

External links 
 Michel Surya reads Exit 
 Entretien radiophonique de Michel Surya sur À bout de souffle devenu la Vie manifeste
 Entretien de Michel Surya à propos de Nietzsche paru dans Les Lettres françaises
 Entretien avec Michel Surya à propos du contrat social sur LaSpirale.org
 Entretien vidéo avec Michel Surya à propos de Sainteté de Bataille
 Entretien vidéo de Michel Surya pour la revue Mouvement

20th-century French non-fiction writers
21st-century French non-fiction writers
20th-century French essayists
21st-century French essayists
French publishers (people)
Prix Goncourt de la Biographie winners
1954 births
Living people